Voodoo Heartbeat (also known as The Sex Serum of Dr. Blake) is a 1972 exploitation horror film directed by Charles Nizet and starring Ray Molina, Philip Ahn, Ern Dugo, Forrest Duke, Ebby Rhodes, Mike Zapata, Ray Molina Jr., Stan Mason, Mary Martinez & Mike Meyers.

Plot 
An experimental serum turns a man into a fanged killer beast.

Cast 

 Ray Molina as Dr. Blake
 Philip Ahn as Mao Tse Tung
 Stan Mason as Inspector Brady

Production 
The film was shot in ATF Studios in Las Vegas, Nevada.

In 1972, the president of TWI International, Robert Saxton, announced that Mike Zapata was going to be the top star of the motion picture and television in a couple of years, but this is only film role.

Release 
The film was theatrically released on October 1975 by TWI National.

Also this film screened on Cannes Film Festival in 1970.

See also 
 Cinema of the United States
 Cinema of Belgium

References

External links 

 

American horror films
1972 films
Belgian horror films
1972 horror films